Frankis Carol Marzo (born 7 September 1987) is a Cuban-born Qatari handball player for Al Rayyan and the Qatar national team.

He represented Qatar at the 2019 World Men's Handball Championship. He later played at the 2021 World Men's Handball Championship, where he finished as top scorer with 58 goals.

Achievements

Club
	Sporting CP 
Portuguese First Division:
Winner: 2017, 2018

Individual
World Men's Handball Championship Top Scorer: 2021

References

1987 births
Living people
Sportspeople from Guantánamo
Cuban male handball players
Qatari male handball players
Expatriate handball players
Cuban emigrants to Qatar
Naturalised citizens of Qatar
Handball players at the 2007 Pan American Games
Pan American Games bronze medalists for Cuba
Pan American Games medalists in handball
Handball players at the 2018 Asian Games
Asian Games medalists in handball
Asian Games gold medalists for Qatar
Medalists at the 2018 Asian Games
Sporting CP handball players
Medalists at the 2007 Pan American Games